Arthur Joseph O'Neill (December 14, 1917 – April 27, 2013) was an American prelate of the Roman Catholic Church. He served as bishop of the Diocese of Rockford in Illinois from 1968 to 1994.

Biography
Arthur O'Neill was born on December 14, 1917, in East Dubuque, Illinois. He was ordained a priest for the Diocese of Providence by Bishop John Boylan on March 27, 1943. 

Pope Paul VI appointed O'Neill as bishop of the Diocese of Rockford on August 19, 1968.  He was consecrated a bishop by Archbishop Gerald Bergan on October 11, 1968.  Contemporary accounts described O'Neill as a compassionate man who enjoyed speaking with parishioners.

Pope John Paul II accepted O'Neill's resignation as bishop of Rockford on April 19, 1994. Arthur O'Neill died on April 27, 2013, in Narragansett, Rhode Island, at the age of 95.

References

1917 births
2013 deaths
20th-century Roman Catholic bishops in the United States
People from Jo Daviess County, Illinois
Roman Catholic bishops of Rockford